SMARTY is a mobile telephone flanker brand operated by Hutchison 3G UK Limited using its Three UK mobile network. It aims to attract customers primarily looking for cheaper deals than those available direct from Three, by offering a monthly rolling SIM-only service, limited to online-only support. On some plans the operator offers to buy back unused data by means of a bill discount, a practice which is not widespread in the UK but is exhibited elsewhere such as by US carrier Ting.

Tariffs 

All plans are monthly, with no contract, and are paid in advance by credit card, debit card, or cash via PayPoint, rather than via the more prevalent Direct Debit method. The company states that no credit checks are made.

All plans (excluding data only plans) include unlimited UK calls and texts. In common with other networks, SMARTY offers a fixed amount of mobile data (or an unlimited amount) for a fixed monthly payment. It also offers "data discount" plans, where the customer pays a £5/month service charge and buys a small number of gigabytes of data. Under these plans, customers who do not use all their data allowance receive a credit on their next month's bill for unused data, calculated per megabyte at the same price as they paid for it. This credit for unused data is unique among UK mobile operators, as is the unified price of data add-ons; 1GB of data is priced the same, regardless of whether it is bought in advance as part of a customer's monthly rolling plan, or bought as an add-on which is consumed only when a customer's monthly allowance is used up. In this respect, the data discount plans are functionally equivalent to standard pay-as-you-go (PAYG) tariffs offered by other providers, such as Three's own PAYG offering, since customers only pay for the exact amount of data that they use.

Around June 2020, SMARTY introduced group plans: a group of two or more customers can share a single online account and payment method, and receive a flat 10% discount on their plan. This discount does not apply to data add-ons.

Upon launch, SMARTY offered hotspot and tethering functionality, although they did not offer the ability to call foreign numbers, roam abroad, or dial premium numbers.
These features became available in 2018.

In early 2018, SMARTY launched a refer-a-friend program. If a customer refers a friend, both would get a free month on SMARTY. There were no limits to this, so if a customer refers one friend a month they would keep their mobile bill free. In 2022, this offer was replaced with a £10 gift card for both customers. The gift cards to choose from are Amazon, John Lewis Partnership, and Uber.

In 2022, SMARTY rolled out data only plans which do not include any calls or texts, unlike their other plans. There are 5 plans available, ranging from 2GB up to an unlimited plan.

Network 
SMARTY runs virtually on the 3UK mobile network, utilising operator code 23420 and Three's IP address range. SMARTY state that there are no speed restrictions or throttling on the network, and SMARTY is not subject to Three's TrafficSense traffic management approach. 4G calling (VoLTE) and Wi-Fi calling (VToW) are enabled on SMARTY, using the same protocol as Three's Wi-Fi calling service and available on the same devices as Three. 5G service is available in areas where Three has 5G coverage.

References

External links 
 

Mobile virtual network operators
2017 establishments in England
Telecommunications companies established in 2017
Companies based in Reading, Berkshire
Telecommunications in the United Kingdom
3 (company)